IGATE was an IT services company, headquartered in Bridgewater, New Jersey, United States. The firm operated in North America, Asia, Europe, Japan and Australia, providing technology consultancy and services. Its revenues in 2014 were over US$1.2 billion, and it has a workforce of over 31,000. The firm had over 70 offices and customer delivery centers in North America, Europe, Asia and Australia. On April 27, 2015 French IT services group Capgemini unveiled a deal to acquire IGATE for $4 billion.

History 
Under the Companies Act of 1956, IGATE was originally incorporated as Mascot Systems Private Limited, in 1993, and later renamed Mascot Systems Limited. It was formerly a subsidiary of Mastech Systems Corporation, now Mastech Digital.

In 2011, IGATE acquired Patni Computer Systems, which was three times its size at the time. With a value of around a billion US dollars, this acquisition was the largest cross-border leveraged transaction in the IT sector, and was accomplished over 12 months, including the de-listing of Patni from the Indian bourses and consolidating the shareholder value in the U.S. Initially. IGATE changed its name to IGATE Patni. It was changed to IGATE again on 7 May 2012. Its shares are listed on the NYSE as "IGATE". On 27 April 2015, Capgemini announced it would be acquiring IGATE, the transition would be completed over a phase of six months. IGATE CEO Ashok Vemuri announced his departure on 6 October 2015.

In January 2016 Capgemini announced that IGATE would operate exclusively under the Capgemini brand, six months after completion of its acquisition of the US-based corporation.

Key services
IGATE's key services included:
Application development
Application maintenance
Business intelligence and Analytics
Business process outsourcing
Cloud services
Enterprise mobility
Infrastructure management services
P&ES embedded systems
Verification and validation (V&V)

Locations 

IGATE customer delivery centers were located in Pensacola, Florida; El Paso, Texas; Sterling, Virginia, United States; Guadalajara, Mexico; Mississauga, Ontario, Canada; Stockholm, Sweden; London, UK; Ballarat, Australia; Suzhou, China; and Mumbai, Bangalore, Pune, Chennai, Trichy, Hyderabad, Noida and Gandhinagar in India.

The IGATE (Patni) Knowledge Park accommodates 17,000 professionals.

Recognition 
 Ranked 51st in the 2014 Fortune "100 Fastest Growing Companies" list
 VCCircle Award 2014

References

Outsourcing in India
Outsourcing companies
Consulting firms established in 1996
Information technology companies of the United States
Companies formerly listed on the Nasdaq
Information technology consulting firms of the United States